The Orangeville Northmen are Junior "A" box lacrosse team from Orangeville, Ontario, Canada.  The Northmen play in the OLA Junior A Lacrosse League.

History

Orangeville Stingers 1975 - 1981
Orangeville Northmen 1982 to Present

The Northmen are connected to the Orangeville Northmen Jr. B, who were recently founded to be a feeder team for the Junior "A" Northmen.

Season-by-season results
Note: GP = Games played, W = Wins, L = Losses, T = Ties, Pts = Points, GF = Goals for, GA = Goals against

Orangeville natives and Northmen alumni in the NLL
Orangeville and the Northmen have produced a number of National Lacrosse League players, coaches, and executives.

 Dillon Ward (Colorado Mammoth)
 Adam Jones (Colorado Mammoth)
 Greg Harnett (Calgary Roughnecks)
 Jon Harnett (Boston Blazers, Calgary Roughnecks)
 Mike Poulin (Toronto Rock, Boston Blazers, Calgary Roughnecks)
 Bill Hostrawser (Washington Stealth, Toronto Rock)
 Rob Hellyer (Toronto Rock) 
 Damon Edwards (Toronto Rock)
 Jesse Gamble (Toronto Rock)
 Hayden Smith (Buffalo Bandits)
 Andrew Suitor (Minnesota Swarm, New England)
 Glen Bryan (Toronto Rock, Buffalo Bandits)
 Craig England (Colorado Mammoth)
 Nick Rose (Boston Blazers, Calgary Roughnecks, Toronto Rock)
 Bruce Codd (Albany Attack, Columbus Landsharks, Montreal Express, Ottawa Rebel, Arizona Sting, Calgary Roughnecks, Toronto Rock)
 Pat Coyle (Detroit Turbos, Ontario Raiders, Toronto Rock, Colorado Mammoth)
 Chad Culp (Buffalo Bandits)
 Darren Halls (Minnesota Swarm)
 Jon Harasym (Columbus Landsharks, Rochester Knighthawks, Minnesota Swarm, Buffalo Bandits, Toronto Rock)
 Bryan Kazarian (Albany Attack, Buffalo Bandits, Chicago Shamrox)
 Mike Kirk (Boston Blazers, Rochester Knighthawks)
 Rusty Kruger (Rochester Knighthawks, New York Saints, Albany Attack, San Jose Sharks, Toronto Rock, Chicago Shamrox, Buffalo Bandits)
 Matt Lyons (Rochester Knighthawks, Boston Blazers)
 Brad MacDonald (Calgary Roughnecks, Toronto Rock, Arizona Sting, Portland Lumberjax)
 Mat MacLeod (Rochester Knighthawks, Orlando Titans, Toronto Rock)
 Mike MacLeod (Toronto Rock)
 Rob Marshall (Toronto Rock)
 Brodie Merrill (Edmonton Rush)
 Patrick Merrill (Orlando Titans, Toronto Rock)
 Brandon Miller (Albany Attack, San Jose Stealth, Chicago Shamrox, Philadelphia Wings, Toronto Rock)
Mackenzie Mitchell (Vancouver, New England) 
 Mike Murray (Toronto Rock)
 Pat O'Toole (New York Saints, Buffalo Bandits, Rochester Knighthawks)
 Jim Rankin (Syracuse Smash)
 Gary Scott (Albany Attack, Toronto Rock)
 Brandon Sanderson (Montreal Express, Ottawa Rebel)
 Chris Sanderson (Baltimore Thunder, Philadelphia Wings, New Jersey Storm)
 Josh Sanderson (Albany Attack, Toronto Rock, Calgary Roughnecks, Boston Blazers)
 Lindsay Sanderson 
 Nathan Sanderson (Toronto Rock)
 Phil Sanderson (Buffalo Bandits, Toronto Rock)
 Ryan Sanderson (Buffalo Bandits, Baltimore Thunder, Albany Attack)
 Shane Sanderson
 Terry Sanderson
 Brandon Slade (Toronto Rock) 
Ty Thompson (Las Vegas Desert Dogs)
 Peter Veltman (Arizona Sting, San Jose Stealth)

External links
Northmen "A" Webpage
The Bible of Lacrosse
Unofficial OLA Page

Ontario Lacrosse Association teams
Sport in Orangeville, Ontario
Lacrosse clubs established in 1975
1975 establishments in Ontario